The Lion, the Witch and the Wardrobe is a 1950 novel by C.S. Lewis. 

The Lion, the Witch and the Wardrobe may also refer to:

 The Lion, the Witch and the Wardrobe (1967 TV serial), ten-part serial broadcast on ITV
 The Lion, the Witch and the Wardrobe (1979 film), animated made-for-TV film produced by Bill Melendez Productions for the Children's Television Workshop
 The Lion, the Witch and the Wardrobe (1988 TV serial), six-episode miniseries, part one of the BBC serial The Chronicles of Narnia
 The Lion, the Witch and the Wardrobe (play), 1989 dramatisation of the novel by le Clanché du Rand
 "The Lion, the Witch and the Wardrobe", 1996 episode of the British sitcom 2point4 children
 Music Inspired by The Chronicles of Narnia: The Lion, the Witch and the Wardrobe, 2005 collection of songs by various Christian artists with common theme The Chronicles of Narnia
 The Chronicles of Narnia: The Lion, the Witch and the Wardrobe, 2005 feature film adaptation of the novel
 The Chronicles of Narnia: The Lion, the Witch and the Wardrobe (video game), 2005 video game based on the 2005 film
 The Chronicles of Narnia: The Lion, the Witch and the Wardrobe (soundtrack), soundtrack of the 2005 film
 Journey into Narnia: Creating The Lion, the Witch, and the Wardrobe, theme park show that operated at Disney's Hollywood Studios from 9 December 2005 to 1 January 2008

See also
The Lyin', the Watch and the Wardrobe, a 2006 episode from the dramedy series Ugly Betty
 "The Doctor, the Widow and the Wardrobe", 2011 Doctor Who Christmas Special partly inspired by the novel